Ticho House (Beit Tikho) is a historical home in Jerusalem, now a museum administered as part of the  Israel Museum. It was one of the first homes built outside the Old City walls in the 19th century.

History
Ticho House was built in the early 1860s outside the Old City walls. It was typical of the urban Ottoman architecture of the time,  with vaulted ceilings, thick walls and a large central hall flanked by side rooms. It was surrounded by a spacious garden. Over the years, rooms were added and the house was extended at the front and back. It was originally known as the Aga Rashid villa. Among its first occupants was the family of the antiquities dealer Moses Wilhelm Shapira, whose daughter Myriam Harry described growing up there in her memoir, "La petite fine de Jerusalem." The family lived there between 1873 and 1883. 

In 1924, Dr. Abraham Albert Ticho, an ophthalmologist, and his wife, Anna Ticho, an artist, bought the house. Dr. Ticho was stabbed and seriously wounded during the 1929 Palestine riots.Thousands of Jews, Christians and Arabs prayed for his recovery. When he was able to return to work, he opened a new clinic on the first floor of Beit Ticho and continued to take patients there until his retirement in 1950.Trachoma was widespread in Jerusalem at the time, and he often treated hundreds of patients per day.  

The Tichos hosted local and British government officials in their home, as well as artists, writers, academics and intellectuals. 

Anna Ticho bequeathed the house and  its contents, including her husband's Judaica collections and library, to the Israel Museum.

Cafe/restaurant
Ticho House operates a kosher dairy restaurant featuring live jazz and classical music performances.

References

External links

  
  

Museums in Jerusalem
Biographical museums in Israel
Israel Museum
Buildings and structures in Jerusalem
Historic house museums in Israel
Restaurants in Jerusalem
Street of the Prophets, Jerusalem
Russian Compound